The 2006 Individual Ice Speedway World Championship was the 41st edition of the World Championship  The Championship was held as a Grand Prix series over four rounds.

Classification

See also 
 2006 Speedway Grand Prix in classic speedway
 2006 Team Ice Racing World Championship

References 

Ice speedway competitions
World